The 2017–18 season was C.D. Marathón's 67th season in existence and the club's 52nd consecutive season in the top fight of Honduran football.  The club got their 9th league title, ending an 8-year drought without league title. They also competed for the 2017 Honduran Supercup, ending as runner-ups.

Overview
Héctor Vargas was hired as new coach, after Manuel Keosseián resigned on June 6.

Apertura

Squad

Standings

Matches

Results by round

Regular season

Semifinals

 Real España won 4–3 on aggregate.

Clausura

Squad

Standings

Matches

Results by round

Regular season

Semifinals

 Marathón won 3–1 on aggregate.

Final

Top scorers

References

C.D. Marathón seasons
Honduran football clubs 2017–18 season